Flat iron steak (US), butlers' steak (UK), feather blade steak (UK) or oyster blade steak (Australia and New Zealand) is a cut of steak cut with the grain from the chuck, or shoulder of the animal.

The cut
This cut of steak is from the shoulder of a beef animal. It is located adjacent to the heart of the shoulder clod, under the seven or paddle bone (shoulder blade or scapula). The steak encompasses the infraspinatus muscles of beef, and one may see this displayed in some butcher shops and meat markets as a top blade roast or informally called a "patio steak". Anatomically, the muscle forms the dorsal part of the rotator cuff of the steer. This cut is anatomically distinct from the shoulder tender, which lies directly below it and is the teres major. 

Steaks that are cross cut from this muscle are called top blade steaks, or chicken steaks. To make it more marketable, the cut which makes up this steak, which has the fascia dividing the infraspinatus within it, has increasingly been cut as two flatter steaks, with the tough fascia removed. This method of breaking down the larger cut was creation of the flat iron steak as we know it today. As a whole cut of meat, the top blade usually weighs around two to three pounds; it usually yields four steaks between eight and 12 ounces each. Flat iron steaks usually have a significant amount of marbling.

In the North American Meat Processor (NAMP) meat buyers guide, it is item #1114D Beef Shoulder, Top Blade Steak. This variation on the original flat iron cut was identified in 2002 as part of a National Cattlemen's Beef Association initiative, in conjunction with the University of Nebraska and the University of Florida to find lower-priced cuts which could be trimmed into steaks and roasts. Kari Underly was one of the meat cutters who helped develop the steak.

References

Cuts of beef